Horrible Histories: The Movie – Rotten Romans is a 2019 British historical comedy film directed by Dominic Brigstocke, based on the book series of the same name by author Terry Deary, and the television series of 2009 and 2015 on CBBC. The film production, of one of the stories, was announced in March 2016. The film is a co-production, between Altitude Film Entertainment, BBC Films and Citrus Films. It was released on 26 July 2019.

Synopsis
Atti, a Roman teenager with brains but no muscle, is always coming up with schemes, but one of these upsets Emperor Nero. For his punishment, he is sent to cold wet Britain on the fringe of the Roman Empire.

Whilst in Britain, he is captured by Orla, a feisty Celt, but they eventually come to an understanding, but to Atti's horror, when he is returned to his regiment, he finds himself pitted against Orla and her tribe at the Battle of Watling Street.

Cast

Production
The rights to a film were optioned from the Horrible Histories author, Terry Deary. The project was filmed in Bulgaria and the United Kingdom.

Reception

Box office
Rotten Romans opened to $754,973 in the United Kingdom. , the film has earned a total of $3.7 million, at the box office.

Critical response
The website's consensus says, "Charmingly broad and appropriately goofy, Horrible Histories: The Movie – Rotten Romans lands its punchlines often enough to entertain its target audience." Peter Bradshaw gave the film three out of five stars.

He describes Derek Jacobi reprising the role which made him famous in 1976 as the Emperor Claudius, as the film's most sensational coup. Bradshaw calls the film "a decent bit of school holiday entertainment" although he felt the broad humour was aimed at (very young) audiences, and not as good as the film Bill, which was produced by the writers and actors from the television series of Horrible Histories.

Wendy Ide gave the film two out of five stars, and felt that the film lacked some of the "essential rottenness", as the linear format of the film rather than the skit-based structure of the series led to a loss of "the punchy hit rate of gung ho, gross out that made the series such a deliciously uncouth pleasure".

References

External links
 

Horrible Histories
2019 films
2019 comedy films
2010s historical comedy films
BBC Film films
British historical comedy films
Cultural depictions of Boudica
Depictions of Nero on film
Films based on children's books
Films based on television series
Films set in the Roman Empire
Films shot in Bulgaria
Films shot in the United Kingdom
2010s English-language films
2010s British films